Diamond Princess is the second album by American rapper Trina. It was released on August 27, 2002, through the Atlantic Records and Slip-N-Slide Records. The album debuted at number 14 on the US Billboard 200 and number 5 on the Top R&B/Hip-Hop Albums chart.

Background 
After promotion for her debut album ended in mid-2000, Trina began recording music with Missy Elliott to create her second album. Recording sessions lasted from 2000 to 2002. Trina was able to choose her own production, name of the songs, and write whatever she wanted. She told TheCrusade.net: "It's more what Trina's about, how Trina looks, how Trina feels, the things that Trina consists of."

Singles 
The lead single, "Told Y'all", featuring Rick Ross, produced by Cool & Dre, reached number 64 on the Hot R&B/Hip-Hop Songs chart, while a second single, "No Panties", featuring Tweet, released on July 16, 2002, only reached number 88 on the Hot R&B/Hip-Hop Songs chart. However, it became her first single to chart outside of the US, as it peaked at number 45 on the UK Singles Chart. The third and final single from the album, "B R Right", featuring Ludacris, produced by Kanye West, was also released on October 22, 2002 and reached number 83 on the Hot 100, number 50 the Hot R&B/Hip-Hop Songs chart and number 24 on the Rap Songs chart.

Critical reception 

AllMusic editor Rovi Staff found that "just as the title Diamond Princess suggests, Trina is a hard-edged jewel that shines with an uncanny brilliance."
Billboard wrote that "though not perfect, Diamond Princess proves that Trina, like the album's gem namesake, is pretty, shiny, and stronger than you might think."

Commercial performance 
The album debuted at number 14 on the US Billboard 200 and number 5 on the Top R&B/Hip-Hop Albums chart, selling 67,000 units in its first week. By June 2007, Diamond Princess had sold up to 501,000 copies according to Billboard.

Track listing 

Sample credits
"Hustling" contains a sample of "No More?" by Eazy-E.
"U & Me" contains a sample of "You and Me" by The O'Jays.
"Kandi" contains a sample of "Candy Girl" by New Edition.
"Get This Money" contains a sample of "Conga" by Miami Sound Machine.

Personnel 
Credits for Diamond Princess adapted from AllMusic.

Missy Elliott: Producer
Paul Gregory: Assistant Engineer
Brian Kraz: Assistant Engineer
Ray Seay: Engineer
Signature: Producer
Alvin Speights: Mixing
Kanye West: Producer
Young Guru: Engineer

Charts

Weekly charts

Year-end charts

References

2002 albums
Albums produced by Cool & Dre
Albums produced by Jim Jonsin
Albums produced by Just Blaze
Albums produced by Kanye West
Albums produced by Missy Elliott
Trina albums
Atlantic Records albums